The 32nd Infantry Brigade was an infantry brigade formation of the British Army that saw active service during both the First and the Second World Wars.

First World War
The Brigade was raised originally as the 32nd Infantry Brigade, part of the 11th (Northern) Division, a New Army formation which served at Gallipoli and on the Western Front during the First World War.

Order of battle
 9th Battalion, The Prince of Wales's Own (West Yorkshire Regiment) (absorbed 1/1st Yorkshire Hussars 19 November 1917 and redesignated 9th (Yorkshire Hussars Yeomanry) Battalion)
 6th Battalion, Alexandra, Princess of Wales Own (Yorkshire Regiment) (left 18 May 1918)
 6th Battalion, The York and Lancaster Regiment
 8th Battalion, The Duke of Wellington's (West Riding Regiment) (disbanded 13 February 1918)
 2nd Battalion, Alexandra, Princess of Wales Own (Yorkshire Regiment) (joined 14 May 1918)
 32nd Brigade Machine Gun Company (formed March 1916, moved into 11th MG Battalion 28 February 1918)
 32nd Trench Mortar Battery (joined 17 July 1916)

Second World War

The Brigade was reformed as 32nd Infantry Brigade (Guards) on 1 October 1941, during the Second World War. In 1942, the brigade joined the Guards Armoured Division, and later saw service during Operation Overlord, the Allied advance from Paris to the Rhine, including Operation Market Garden, and the Western Allied invasion of Germany.

Order of battle
 5th Battalion, Coldstream Guards
 1st Battalion, Welsh Guards
 3rd Battalion, Irish Guards
 2nd Battalion, Scots Guards
 2nd Battalion, Welsh Guards

Commanders
 Brigadier L. Bootle-Wilbraham
 Brigadier G.L. Verney
 Brigadier J.C.O. Marriott
 Brigadier G.F. Johnson
 Lieutenant-Colonel J.C. Windsor-Lewis
 Brigadier J.O.E. Vandeleur

Postwar
The Brigade was reraised in the early 1950s and joined the 3rd Infantry Division. The Brigade was moved from Cyprus to reinforce the British forces in the Canal Zone in February 1952, but was later disbanded by being redesignated 29th Infantry Brigade.

Bibliography

References

Infantry brigades of the British Army
Infantry brigades of the British Army in World War I